Hillsboro Historic District may refer to:

in the United States
(by state then city)
Hillsborough Historic District, Hillsborough, North Carolina, listed on the National Register of Historic Places (NRHP)
Hillsboro Historic Business District, Hillsboro, Ohio, listed on the NRHP in Highland County, Ohio
Hillsboro-West End Historic District, Nashville Tennessee, listed on the NRHP in Davidson County, Tennessee
Hillsboro Residential Historic District, Hillsboro Texas, listed on the NRHP in Hill County, Texas
Hillsboro Historic District (Hillsboro, Virginia), NRHP-listed 
Hillsborough (Walkerton, Virginia), listed on the NRHP in King and Queen County, Virginia